This is a list of English football transfers for the 2007–08 winter transfer window. Only moves featuring at least one Premiership or Championship club are listed.

The winter transfer window opened on 1 January 2008, although a few transfers will take place prior to that date; the first non-free non-loan move went through on 12 December 2007. The window closed at midnight on 31 January. Players without a club may join one, either during or in between transfer windows. Clubs below Premiership level may also sign players on loan at any time. If need be, clubs may sign a goalkeeper on an emergency loan, if all others are unavailable.

Transfers

See also
List of English football transfers Summer 2007
List of English football transfers Summer 2008

Notes and references

Trans
Winter 2007-08
England